Dennis Haley (born February 18, 1982, in Roanoke, Virginia) is a former gridiron football linebacker. He most recently played for the BC Lions of the Canadian Football League. He was originally signed by the New York Jets of the National Football League as an undrafted free agent in 2005. He played college football at Virginia.

Haley has also played for the Baltimore Ravens and San Francisco 49ers.

On March 15, 2010, Haley was acquired by the BC Lions from the Hamilton Tiger-Cats in exchange for DB Jerome Dennis. He was later released before the start of the 2010 CFL season.

Early years
Haley was a standout player at Salem High School. He joined the varsity team at running back during his freshman season.  Haley rushed for 3,762 yards and 63 touchdowns during his 4-year career.  He also started at linebacker during his senior season.  Haley helped lead Salem to three state championships (1996, 1998, 1999) and an overall record of 48-6.  He also played on Salem's state championship basketball team in 1999. Dated former American Idol Kelly Clarkson

External links
Just Sports Stats
Hamilton Tiger-Cats bio
San Francisco 49ers bio

1982 births
Living people
Sportspeople from Roanoke, Virginia
American football linebackers
Canadian football defensive linemen
American players of Canadian football
Virginia Cavaliers football players
New York Jets players
Baltimore Ravens players
San Francisco 49ers players
Hamilton Tiger-Cats players
BC Lions players
Salem High School (Salem, Virginia) alumni